The Trofeo Junta de Comunidades de Castilla-La Mancha is the regional stage of the Copa RFEF in Castile-La Mancha and its main regional cup. Organized by the Castile-La Mancha Football Federation, it is played by the best teams of the region.

History
Created in 1997 as Trofeo Junta de Comunidades de Castilla-La Mancha, it was folded in 2010.

In 2016, the Government of Castile-La Mancha decided to reinstate the tournament as the Regional Stage of the Copa Federación de España. One year later, the club recovered the old name of the tournament, this time being played without the teams of qualified for the Copa del Rey.

Finals

Champions

References

External links
Castile-La Mancha Football Federation

Castile-La Mancha
Football in Castilla–La Mancha